Ares is a 2016 French dystopian science fiction film directed by Jean-Patrick Benes.  Ola Rapace stars as a boxer who is forced into testing a dangerous new performance-enhancing drug for one of the corporations that now controls France.  It premiered at the Paris Comic-con on October 21 and was released in France on 11 November 2016.

Plot 
In the 2020s, France's economy collapses, and corporations buy its debt. More than 15% of the population is unemployed and living in squalid homeless encampments-the largest being under the Eiffel Tower. Although still nominally a republic, the corporations take control of the government and pass sweeping reforms, deregulating many industries.  Among these changes, doping  and human experimentation are legalized.  As homelessness and unemployment rise, violent new sports are introduced.  Athletes become sponsored by pharmaceutical companies, who test their new drugs on them.   After a promising start, boxer Reda, who fights under the pseudonym Ares, is injured and loses his corporate sponsor.  Besides performing in brutal cage matches as a low-ranked fighter, he takes jobs for a female corporate agent Altman, with whom he has a relationship. The corporate-run police department hire unemployed temporary workers during periods of civil unrest, with Reda being one of riot security guards on the front lines. During a riot, he notices his niece(an advocate of anti-corporatism) getting placed in a police van and he manages to get her released.

When his sister Carla is framed for possession of an illegal pistol, Altman tells Reda that Carla will be charged as a terrorist.  The only way to save her from a prison sentence is to bribe the officials, which will take €100,000.  To raise the money, Reda is forced to submit to human experimentation for HSX, a drug that has killed every other test subject.  Although corporate executive Anna assures him his biochemistry will likely allow him to survive the drug, she warns that he will black out five minutes after taking it.  Reda leaves Carla's children with his neighbor, a cross-dressing prostitute named Myosotis who believes Reda to be a fascist.  Despite their antagonistic relationship, Myosotis agrees to help him for the sake of the children.  Unable to bet on himself, Reda convinces Myosotis to bet Reda's meager life savings on the fight.

Needing a dramatic demonstration to spur sales, the chief executive officer arranges for Reda to fight a highly-ranked fighter who has had his nervous system tweaked so that he no longer feels pain.  The fight is widely believed to be impossible for Reda to win, and even his coach declines to bet on Reda.  HSX performs well, and Reda wins against 12:1 odds.  The drug becomes a sensation, and Reda makes enough money to free Carla, using Myosotis as a middleman.  Before he can, she dies in prison while attempting to save another inmate.  Altman offers to return the money, but Reda asks her to use it to find out who framed his sister.  At the same time, Anouk's boyfriend Boris, a hacker who supports the resistance, provides evidence that implicates Reda's coach.

Reda once again leaves the children with Myosotis.  During his next fight, Reda goes down in 17 seconds, and his earlier win is written off as a fluke.  Sales of HSX plummet, and Reda's coach is financially ruined.  When Reda meets with him, Reda reveals that he did not take the drug and intentionally threw the fight.  Instead, he saved the drug to administer it to his coach, who quickly dies once he is injected.  Anna finds Reda and tells him that she has ordered Altman to kidnap Carla's children.  Anna says that although Altman truly does care for him, Altman cares more for money.  Reda reluctantly agrees to a demonstration in front of the corporate board.  At Reda's house, Altman orders Anouk to call Myosotis.  Anouk tells Myosotis that Reda wishes to thank him, a deeply uncharacteristic action.  Suspicious, Myosotis recruits Boris' hacking talents for help.

Boris and Myosotis rescue the children and kill Altman.  Once they signal Reda that they are safe, Reda takes HSX and throws the chief executive officer out of a window.  Anna's bodyguards, two genetically engineered clones of the most powerful arena fighters, initially gain an advantage on Reda.  However, Anna forbids them from killing him, as they need him for more drug trials.  Handicapped by having to take Reda alive, both die.  With the five minute time limit running out, Reda considers killing Anna but instead assists Boris in remotely hacking into the corporation's mainframe.  There, Boris uncovers proof that over 30,000+ people died in HSX's drug trials.  Knowing his nieces will never be safe from the corporation while he is alive as "patient zero", Reda commits suicide despite Anna's protests which destroys the future of the drug HSX. Boris hijacks the advertising, media display system and shows the extent of HSX's failed drug trials and Reda's death. The death of Reda starts a movement against the corporate leadership of France and massive riots ensue.

Themes 
Ares uses the current events of government bond indebtedness and corporate/public governance as a historical backdrop. Also seen are references to the Gilet Jaune movement including scenes that replicate Yellow Vest Riots of Paris. France unemployement levels, Le Chomage, are one of the grievances of the movement. References to Big Pharma and the direct marketing of drugs to the populace using corporate media also play heavily in the film.

Cast 
 Ola Rapace as Reda
 Micha Lescot as Myosotis
 Thierry Hancisse as Reda's coach
 Hélène Fillières as Altman
 Ruth Vega Fernandez as Anna
 Eva Lallier as Anouk
 Elina Soloman as Mae
 Yvon Martin as Tyro
 Pierre Perrier as Boris
 Émilie Gavois-Kahn as Carla
 Louis-Do de Lencquesaing as PDG Donevia
 Alexis Michalik as National Defense Framework

Release 
Ares premiered at the Paris Comic-con on 21 October 2016.  It was released in France on 11 November 2016.

Reception 
On French review aggregator website AlloCiné, Ares has an average rating of 3.1/5 stars based on 14 reviews from professional critics.  Jordan Mintzer of The Hollywood Reporter wrote, "It's a film that in its best moments revisits the smoggy neo-urban textures of Blade Runner but otherwise feels like a questionable cross between Bloodsport and Babylon A.D."

References

External links 
 

2016 films
2010s science fiction thriller films
Films about drugs
French science fiction thriller films
2010s French-language films
2010s dystopian films
French vigilante films
2010s vigilante films
Films set in the 2020s
Films set in Paris
Mixed martial arts films
2010s French films